John Ken Nuzzo (ジョン・健・ヌッツォ; born 5 May 1966) is an American tenor of Japanese origin.

Biography
John Ken (born in Tokyo), has a Japanese mother and an American father. He moved to the United States and made his debut in Bach's B minor Mass with the Master Chorale of Orange County, which was highly acclaimed in Los Angeles Times. Performed with Tony Bennett and Shirley Jones as a member of the "Californians".

In 1997 he won first prize in Japan Vocal Competition. Nuzzo was the winner of the Japan round of the International Hans Gabor Belvedere Singing Competition Wien in 1998. He signed a fest contract and debuted with the Vienna State Opera in 2000. He was highly acclaimed by Beuhne Wien for the role of Novice in Britten's Billy Budd the same year. In 2001, he was awarded the Eberhard Waechter Medal, given annually to the two most promising new artists among the Austrian opera houses. His performance in Vienna was introduced by the Japanese TV documentary program, Jonetsu Tairiku.

In 2002, he made his Salzburg Festival debut as Syphax in Zemlinsky's King Kandaules under the baton of Kent Nagano. Invited to sing in NHK's Red and White Concert, Japan's longest-running New Year's Eve Concert on TV, which spread his fame in Japan overnight. Sang the tenor solo in Berlioz Requiem with the NHK Symphony Orchestra under the baton of Charles Dutoit. The following year, he was awarded the Idemitsu Music Award in Japan. Debuted with the Metropolitan Opera under the baton of James Levine. Debuted with the Munich Philharmonic Orchestra in the concert version of Fidelio, under the baton of James Levine.

In 2004, he sang the theme song of NHK’s historical drama series Shinsengumi. Made his second appearance on NHK’s Red and White Concert.

In 2006, he joined TO LIVE 2006 "Children Fighting Cancer Charity Concert", performed with Milva as the first person sang together in Japan. The following year, he sang Rinuccio in Gianni Schicci at the Metropolitan Opera. Made his Pittsburg Opera debut as Nemorino in Donizetti's L’Elisir d’Amore.

In 2008, he played Rossillon in Lehar [The Merry Widow] produced by Yutaka Sado.

Awards
1985 - A’litalia International Singing Competition, 2nd place.
1992 - Los Angeles Young Artists Vocal Competition, 1st place; Los Angeles Opera Guild Competition, 1st place.
Palm Springs Opera Guild Competition, 3rd place; Pasadena Opera Guild Competition, 1st place; Riverside Opera Guild Competition, 1st place.
Whittier Chorus Competition, 2nd place; Opera 100 Competition, 1st place; S.A.I. Vocal Competition, 1st place; Orange County Musical Arts Competition, 1st Place.
1993 - NATS  "Los Angeles Artist of the Year"
1997 - Japan Vocal Competition, 1st place.
1998 - International Hans Gabor Belvedere Singing Competition Japan, Winner.   
2001 - Eberhard Waechter Gesangsmedailen Austria 2001, Winner.
2003 - Japan Idemitsu Music Award 2003, Winner

Discography (CD)
Franz Schubert : 11 selected songs from “Die schöne Müllerin, Op.25, D.795” - Fontec
NUZZO meets PUCCINI - Fontec
Rare Live Track 2020 - Fontec
BEETHOVEN×SCHUBERT - Fontec
Serenata(Italian Art Songs) -Fontec
“DICHTERLIEBE Op.48” -Fontec
NUZZO JAZZ _
Italian Aria - Fontec
Tenorissimo  - Universal Classics & Jazz
NHK Taiga Historical Drama Shinsengumi!  Original Soundtrack- Universal Classics & Jazz
Treasure Voice - Universal Classics & Jazz
Petr Turrini/Friedrich Cerha [Der Riese Vom Stenfeld]- ORF
Zemlinsky [DER KONIG KANDAULES] Salzburg Festival 2002 -Andante
Benjamin Britten [Billy Budd] - Orfeo d'or

Discography (DVD)
Shigaki Saegusa [KAMIKAZE] - Sony Music Japan International
Giuseppe Verdi [SIMON BOCCANEGRA] - ORF

References

External links
John Ken Nuzzo Official Website
OPERABASE

1966 births
Living people
Japanese operatic tenors
Japanese people of American descent
Singers from Tokyo
20th-century Japanese male singers
20th-century Japanese singers
21st-century Japanese male singers
21st-century Japanese singers